Niall Ó Dónaill (27 August 1908 – 10 February 1995) was an Irish language lexicographer from Ailt an Eidhinn, Loughanure, County Donegal. He was the oldest of the six children of Tarlach Ó Dónaill and Éilis Nic Ruairí from Grial, Loughanure. They had a little land and a few cows. His father would spend June to November working in Scotland and died when Niall Ó Dónaill was 13 years old. Ó Dónaill himself would spend summers working in the tunnels in Scotland.

During his time in university he would spend his summers teaching at Coláiste Bhríde, Rann na Feirste.

Ó Dónaill is most famous for his work as editor of the 1977 Irish-English dictionary Foclóir Gaeilge-Béarla, which is still widely used today.

Ó Dónaill received his education at Scoil Loch an Iúir in Loughanure before gaining a scholarship to St Eunan's College in Letterkenny. Another scholarship took him to University College Dublin to study Irish, English and History. In June 1982 he was awarded a D.Litt by Trinity College Dublin.

Ó Dónaill wrote the book Bruigheann Féile which is based on stories of pastimes in the Gaeltacht town Loughanure and its surrounding area. Ó Dónaill's book Na Glúnta Rosannacha was first published in 1952.

He was awarded Gradam an Oireachtais at Oireachtas na Gaeilge in 1980.

Ó Dónaill died in 1995.

Bibliography
Dictionary:

1977 - Foclóir Gaeilge-Béarla - Irish-English dictionary known as Foclóir Uí Dhónaill

Books:

1934 - Bruighean feille - a collection of short stories and historical events in Loughanure

1937 - Beatha Sheáin Mhistéil - The life of John Mitchel

1951 - Forbairt na Gaeilge

1952 - Na Glúnta Rosannacha - the history of The Rosses and the story of the O'Donnell dynasty

Translation work:

1932 - Scairt an dúthchais (The Call of the Wild by Jack London);

1932 - Ise (She: A History of Adventure by H. Rider Haggard);

1935 - Máire (Marie (novel) by H. Rider Haggard);

1935 - Cineadh an fhásaigh (The kindred of the wild by Charles G. D. Roberts);

1935 - Mac rí na hÉireann (The King of Ireland's Son by Padraic Colum);

1936 - An chloch órtha (The Talisman (Scott novel) by Walter Scott);

1936 - Roibeart Emmet (Robert Emmet by Raymond Postgate);

1937 - An Ministir Ó Ceallaigh (Parson Kelly by A.E.W. Mason and Andrew Lang);

1938 - Commando (Commando by Denys Reitz);

1938 - Maighistir Bhaile na Trágha (The Master of Ballantrae by Robert Louis Stevenson)

1939 - An tOllphéist (Juggernaut by Alice Campbell);

1946 - Seachrán na nAingeal (The Demi-Gods by James Stephens);

1958 - Dhá choinneal do Mhuire (a religious publication by H.B. Zimmerman)

Cathair Phrotastúnach (a book about Belfast by Denis Ireland)

Unpublished - An Bealach chun na Róimhe (The path to Rome by Hilaire Belloc)

References

External links
Foclóir Gaeilge-Béarla (Ó Dónaill, 1977)

1908 births
1995 deaths
20th-century Irish writers
Irish-language writers
Alumni of University College Dublin
Linguists from the Republic of Ireland
Irish lexicographers
People educated at St Eunan's College
People from County Donegal
20th-century linguists
20th-century lexicographers